Soyuz TMA-1, also catalogued as Soyuz TM-35, was a 2002 Soyuz mission to the International Space Station (ISS) launched by a Soyuz FG launch vehicle with a Russian-Belgian cosmonaut crew blasted off from the Baikonur Cosmodrome in Kazakhstan. This was the fifth Russian Soyuz spacecraft to fly to the ISS. It was also the first flight of the TMA-class Soyuz spacecraft.   Soyuz TM-34 was the last of the prior Soyuz-TM spacecraft to be launched.

Crew

Mission parameters
Mass: 7,220 kg (15,910 lb), gross	
Perigee: 193 km	
Apogee: 235 km	
Inclination: 51.6°	
Period: 88.7 minutes

Docking with ISS
Docked to ISS: November 1, 2002, 05:01 UTC (to Pirs module)
Undocked from ISS: May 3, 2003, 22:43 UTC (from Pirs module)

Specifications
Section ref: Astro
Gross mass: 7,220 kg (15,910 lb).
Unfuelled mass: 6,320 kg (13,930 lb).
Height: 6.98 m (22.90 ft).
Diameter: 2.20 m (7.20 ft).
Span: 10.70 m (35.10 ft).
Thrust: 3.92 kN (881 lbf).
Specific impulse: 305 s.

Mission highlights
In the spring of 2001, a taxi mission to the space station was being scheduled to take place in October 2002. At first the crew was to be Commander Sergei Zalyotin and Flight Engineer Frank De Winne; however, a report released in February 2002 stated that American musician Lance Bass was interested in joining the crew for a one-week mission on board the Russian spacecraft. The mission began to fall through, and by September 2002 they had discontinued the training of Lance Bass due to the mission organizers' failure to meet the terms of the contract. They filled the vacant seat left by Lance Bass with Russian cosmonaut Yuri Lonchakov.

While the Soyuz TMA-1 was on orbit, the Columbia shuttle accident occurred and required a change in crew changeout process.  The Soyuz system would become the sole method for crew to launch to and return from ISS, until the space shuttle was returned to service in July 2005.

Soyuz TMA-1 disembarked from ISS on May 4, 2003 and immediately began its return to Earth, marking the first entry and descent for this Soyuz class.  A technical malfunction caused the Soyuz control system to abandon the gentler controlled entry and descent and instead fall back to the harsher ballistic reentry and descent.  This resulted in a steep and off target landing of the spacecraft.  The craft landed 300 miles short of the planned area, and the crew was subjected to severe gravitational loads.  Communication with the Soyuz was lost because one antenna was ripped off during descent, and two more did not deploy.  The crew regained communications through an emergency transmitter after landing.  Due to this event, future crews would be provided with a satellite phone to establish contact with recovery forces.

Subsequent Soyuz TMA missions were able to successfully execute controlled reentries, until the Soyuz TMA-10 and Soyuz TMA-11 missions which both also reverted to ballistic descents.

References

Footnotes

External links

NASA.gov: Expedition 21 and Soyuz TMA-1

Crewed Soyuz missions
Spacecraft launched in 2002
Spacecraft which reentered in 2003
Spacecraft launched by Soyuz-FG rockets